The Ulma is a river in Mazanovsky District, Amur Oblast, Russia.

The river flows across a largely uninhabited area except for Ulma village on its banks. It is a rafting and fishing destination.

History
Pottery fragments belonging to the Paleolithic Selemdzha culture (SLM) were found at the archaeological site Ust-Ulma-1 by the river. Organic content in a potsherd found at the site was dated back to between 8,900 and 12,590 years ago.

Course
The Ulma is a left tributary of the Selemdzha. It has its origin at the confluence of the Right Ulma and Left Ulma (Bordak) in the western slopes of the Turan Range. The river flows fast in a roughly southwestern direction in its upper reaches. In its middle and lower course it first flows northwestwards and then westwards, meandering across a very marshy floodplain dotted with small lakes and oxbows.

The Ulma river basin is mainly rain-fed and the spring-summer period accounts for up to 90% of the annual water runoff. Floods are frequent not only in spring, but also in the summer and autumn and are often quite massive. The river freezes in late October to early November and stays under ice until late April to early May.

Fauna
Taimen, lenok, grayling, crucian carp, pike, burbot and Amur catfish are some of the common fish species in the waters of the Ulma river.

See also
List of rivers of Russia

References

External links 
Река Ульма 2006 год, Амурская область, рыбалка
Сплав по реке Ульма

Rivers of Amur Oblast
Drainage basins of the Sea of Okhotsk